Rock Rift may refer to the following locations in Delaware County, New York:

 Rock Rift, New York, a hamlet
 Rock Rift Mountain, a mountain